The Charlotte Running Track, locally known as the Charlotte Runner or the Charlotte Branch, is a CSX Transportation-controlled branch line located in Rochester, New York.

History
The Charlotte Branch was built in the 1880s by the Rome, Watertown and Ogdensburg Railroad, and passed through ownership by the New York Central Railroad, Penn Central and Conrail before CSX acquired the line as part of the Conrail breakup in 1999.

Trackage
The Charlotte Runner branches off of the CSX main at CP-373 via a wye that allows access from either the west or the east. Heading north, the line passes under Interstate 490 before reaching a switch that leads to the Falls Road Industrial Track, the lone remaining remnant of the Conrail Falls Road Secondary in Rochester. Just past this switch, another split on the line heads east to the former New York Central mainline trackage, which is no longer used due to the lack of customers following the closure of the Kleen Brite chemical company in 2004. Meanwhile, the Charlotte Branch continues to the north toward Kodak Park.

North of Driving Park Avenue, the Charlotte Runner parallels the Rochester and Southern Railroad. The two lines follow one another into Kodak Park, the gigantic industrial complex run by Eastman Kodak and maintained via an intra-plant railroad. Just north of West Ridge Road, the KPRR interchanges with both tracks. The RSR and the Charlotte Runner then turn to the northeast for a stretch before the RSR turns to the north while the Charlotte Runner continues northeast, following the path of the Genesee River.

Just before the Genesee empties into Lake Ontario in Charlotte, the line turns west onto the former Hojack Line. The track continues to the west for just under two miles before coming to an end at Dewey Avenue after crossing the Lake Ontario State Parkway, roughly a half mile after the switch to the power plant.

Statistics
Though much more important in previous years (see Usage for more info), the Charlotte Runner is still a vital piece of CSX's trackage in Monroe County. There are four online customers on the line, one of which is the largest CSX customer in the Rochester area.

Customers

Current
Marshall Boxes, Rochester
Comac Builders Supply, Rochester
Eastman Kodak, Rochester
International Paper, Rochester (aka "the box shop" to CSX crews)

Former
Plywood Plastics, Rochester
RG&E Russell Station, Greece (plant decommissioned in 2009 – currently in demolition)

Interchanges
CSX, Rochester
Rochester Switching Services, Rochester  (formerly the Kodak Park Railroad which has been outsourced to a subsidiary of Genesee & Wyoming Industries)

Mass Transit
None (However, the line is in proximity to the Port of Rochester, where the terminal for the ferry that traveled between Toronto and Rochester from 2003 to 2005 is located)

Usage
Despite being a branch line, the Charlotte Runner has seen its share of mainline traffic over the years. Until 2009, long coal trains made their way to the Russell Station every month, the line also carried coal trains that went to RG&E's BeeBee plant located near High Falls in downtown Rochester. These trains would travel the length of the runner and, after crossing onto the Hojack portion of the line, would travel east on the Hojack (as, at this time, the Hojack was intact for a short distance to the east of the Charlotte Runner), crossing over the Genesee River on a swing bridge that dates back to the days of the RW&O, and returning to the city on the Rochester Running Track. The plant and the line were closed within two years of each other and, by 1998, the Rochester Runner and the Hojack east of the Charlotte Runner were abandoned and removed. The swing bridge, the final remnant of this portion, was decommissioned in 2012 by order of the US Coast Guard.

Following the closure of the BeeBee plant, volume along the Runner significantly decreased due to the lack of coal trains for the BeeBee. This amount was reduced even further after RG&E shut down Russell Station in 2009, leaving Kodak as the only major customer on the line.  

CSX continues to make use of the former Hojack trackage up to Russell Station for car storage, bringing up Kodak trains to the West Yard between Lake Avenue and Greenleaf Road to run around power or perform further switching duties, rather than tying up traffic on Ridge Road and Ridgeway Avenues near Eastman Business Park.

References

CSX Transportation lines
Rail infrastructure in New York (state)
New York Central Railroad lines